The German Men's Curling Championship is the national championship of men's curling teams in Germany. It has been held annually since the 1965–1966 season, and is organized by the German Curling Association.

List of champions and medallists
Team line-ups shows in order: fourth, third, second, lead, alternate (if exists), coach (if exists); skips marked bold.

See also
German Women's Curling Championship

References

Curling competitions in Germany
Curling competitions in West Germany
Recurring sporting events established in 1966
1966 establishments in Germany
National curling championships